Sir Peter James Donnelly  (born 15 May 1959) is an Australian-British  mathematician and Professor of Statistical Science at the University of Oxford, and the CEO of Genomics PLC. He is a specialist in applied probability and has made contributions to coalescent theory.  His research group at Oxford has an international reputation for the development of statistical methodology to analyze genetic data.

Background, family and education 
Peter James Donnelly was born and raised in Brisbane, Queensland, the son of financial adviser, economic theorist and author Austin Donnelly and Sheila Donnelly. He is the brother of Sharon Donnelly and of eminent Australian financier, funds manager and company director Melda Donnelly. He was educated at St. Joseph's Christian Brothers College, Gregory Terrace, and later at the University of Queensland and at Balliol College, Oxford.

Professional life 

When elected to a chair at Queen Mary College, London in 1988 Donnelly was only 29. He held a chair at the University of Chicago (1994–96) and was head of the Department of Statistics at the University of Oxford from 1996 to 2001. From 2007 to 2018, he was Director, Wellcome Trust Centre for Human Genetics (WTCHG) in Oxford. He is a fellow at St Anne's College, Oxford.

Many leading statistical geneticists worked with Donnelly as young researchers including David Balding, Matthew Stephens and Jonathan Pritchard. One area in which he has a leading reputation is in the interpretation of DNA evidence. He has acted as an expert witness on forensic science in criminal trials.

He is noted for his collaborative work with biologists. He has been heavily involved in a number of large scale projects, such as the International HapMap Project and the Wellcome Trust Case Control Consortium, a genome-wide association study.

In 2015, Donnelly was elected as Chairman of the Royal Society's Machine Learning Working Group

Awards and honours 

Donnelly was elected a Fellow of the Royal Society in 2006 and also elected as a Fellow of the Academy of Medical Sciences in 2008.

Other significant awards and honours have included:

 1980  University Medal, University of Queensland
 1980-1983  Rhodes Scholarship
 1984-1985  University of Wales Research Fellowship
 1988 Elected Ordinary Member of the International Statistical Institute
 1990  Special Invited Lecturer, Institute of Mathematical Statistics
 1990-1995  SERC Advanced Fellowship
 1995  Elected Fellow of the Institute of Mathematical Statistics
 1999  Elected Honorary Fellow, Institute of Actuaries
 2000  Bernoulli Lecturer, 5th World Congress of the Bernoulli Society
 2001 Forum Lecturer, European Meeting of Statisticians
 2002 Editor's Invited Paper, Statistical Society of Australia
 2002 Mitchell Prize, of the American Statistical Association and ISBA
 2004 Guy Medal in Silver, Royal Statistical Society
 2007 Medallion Lecturer, Institute of Mathematical Statistics.
 2007 The main paper from the Wellcome Trust Case Control Consortium, which Donnelly chaired, won several awards, including The Lancets Paper of the Year, Scientific Americans Research Leader of the Year, the Amadeus Prize, and one of Nature's Editor's Picks for 2007.
 2009 Awarded the Weldon Memorial Prize
 2022 Awarded an honorary doctoral degree from the University of Melbourne

Donnelly was knighted in the 2019 Birthday Honours for services to the understanding of human genetics in disease.

See also
 R v Adams

References

External links
 
 Peter Donnelly: How juries are fooled by statistics (TEDGlobal 2005)
 Nuffield department of Medicine-Podcast meet our researchers
 BBC Inside Science program -interview with Adam Rutherford re his work on the genetic map of the UK

Living people
Academics of Queen Mary University of London
Alumni of Balliol College, Oxford
Australian statisticians
Australian emigrants to England
Fellows of the Royal Society
Fellows of the Academy of Medical Sciences (United Kingdom)
Fellows of St Anne's College, Oxford
Genetic epidemiologists
Australian people of Irish descent
Population geneticists
1959 births
Knights Bachelor